Tedhi Baat Shekhar Ke Saath is an Indian comedy series airs on SAB TV. The series premiered on 6 July 2009, starring Shekhar Suman and Gurpal Singh as the main characters.

Concept
Tedhi Baat Shekhar Ke Saath is a fake interview show in which Shekhar Suman disguises as some celebrity (politician, comedian, etc...) and gives nuisance replies to the questions of stand-up comedian Gurpaal Singh. The guests being interviewed are imaginary but often resemble a well known person.
The show is inspired by Loose Talk (Pakistani TV series)  by Moin Akhtar and Anwar Maqsood.

References

Sony SAB original programming
Indian comedy television series
Indian television sketch shows
2009 Indian television series debuts
Indian political television series